Pharae was an ancient city in Boeotia, Greece. The city was located a short distance from Tanagra.

References

Cities in ancient Greece
Lost ancient cities and towns
Populated places in ancient Boeotia
Former populated places in Greece
Ancient Greek cities